The Sacramento Monarchs were a basketball team based in Sacramento, California. They played in the Women's National Basketball Association (WNBA) from 1997 until folding on November 20, 2009. They played their home games at ARCO Arena.

The Monarchs were one of the WNBA's eight original franchises and were noted early on for standout players Ticha Penicheiro, Ruthie Bolton and Yolanda Griffith. They were the sister franchise of the Sacramento Kings National Basketball Association (NBA) team. They were one of the more successful WNBA franchises on the court, though they often trailed behind perennial Western Conference champions the Houston Comets and the Los Angeles Sparks. However, in 2005, the team brought Sacramento its first championship, winning the WNBA Finals for the only time.

Franchise history

Origins (1997–2003)
The Monarchs made an impact in the WNBA almost immediately. With the hiring of Portuguese national team player Ticha Penicheiro, popular player Ruthie Bolton and prolific scorer Yolanda Griffith, all of whom have been WNBA All-Stars, the Monarchs have been able to make the playoffs almost every year so far, but were normally eliminated before reaching the WNBA Finals.

Gaining control (2004–2006)
After losing to the Seattle Storm in the 2004 WNBA Western Conference Championship, the Monarchs made major roster moves to improve the team – obtaining younger players and emphasizing Head Coach John Whisenant's defense-oriented system. Bolton, one of the team's original players, became a free agent and the Monarchs made the difficult decision not to keep her on the active playing roster, though they did offer her a position in their front office. Edna Campbell, a breast cancer survivor and another fan favorite, was not signed by the Monarchs and later signed with the San Antonio Silver Stars.

On March 3, 2005, the Monarchs traded Tangela Smith and a 2006 second round draft pick to the Charlotte Sting in exchange for former Stanford University standout Nicole Powell, Olympia Scott-Richardson, and Erin Buescher. After signing two Chinese players, Miao Lijie and Sui Feifei, the Monarchs traded Chantelle Anderson to the San Antonio Silver Stars for a 2006 draft pick. During the 2005 WNBA Draft, the Monarchs drafted point guard Kristin Haynie from Michigan State University and Chelsea Newton from Rutgers University. The Monarchs did sign Ruthie Bolton as a free agent for the purpose of her trying to win a spot on team's roster during its pre-season training camp, but eventually waived her. Bolton later joined the Monarchs to work in their promotions and public relations department.

The offseason moves immediately paid off for the Monarchs as the team finished with a franchise-best 25–9 win–loss record. Whisenant was later named the WNBA Coach of the Year, and Powell received the WNBA Most Improved Player Award. After previous seasons of being eliminated from the WNBA Playoffs by either the Houston Comets or the Los Angeles Sparks, the Monarchs finally defeated both, sweeping both teams en route to their first appearance in the WNBA Finals. The Monarchs won their first ever WNBA Finals by defeating the Connecticut Sun, three games to one in a best-of-five playoff series, which brought the city of Sacramento its second major championship in a professional sport. After winning the championship, the Monarchs became the first women's professional team to appear on a Wheaties box.

The Monarchs remained strong in 2006, finishing second place in the West. The Monarchs would catch fire in the playoffs, once again sweeping both Houston and then top seeded LA to reach the Finals for the second straight season. But in the Finals, they were defeated by the Detroit Shock 3 games to 2, in the first WNBA Finals to go 5 games.

Decline (2007–2009)
In 2007, the Monarchs finished strongly again, but blew a chance to get the #2 seed at the end of the season. They were matched up against the San Antonio Silver Stars. After defeating the Silver Stars in game 1 at home, the Monarchs would lose games 2 & 3 (and the series) in San Antonio, ending their two-year run as  Western Conference champions.

In 2008 the Monarchs were markedly less strong, but hung around the Western Playoff picture all season and finished with the #4 seed. Facing the Silver Stars again in the first round, the Monarchs were hoping for some payback for 2007. The series did not start well for the Monarchs, as they dropped Game 1 at home 85-78. Now the series shifted to San Antonio, and it seemed the series would come to a quick end. But the Monarchs would not back down, blowing out the Silver Stars in Game 2 84-67, forcing the critical Game 3. In Game 3, the Stars came out strong and at one point had a 14-point lead. But the Monarchs put together a furious rally, scoring seven points in the final 90 seconds of play to even the game and force it to overtime. But unfortunately for the Monarchs, the Silver Stars came out strong in the extra period and won the game, 86-81, ending the Monarchs' season.

In 2009, the Monarchs had one of their worst seasons in franchise history. It also led to the firing of head coach Jenny Boucek during the season, after which she was replaced by John Whisenant, the coach that led the Monarchs to their first championship in 2005. They finished 12-22, last in the conference and the league. They also missed the playoffs for the first time since the 2002 season and tied the record for the most losses with 22, the same number of losses they made 11 years ago.

Dissolution
It was revealed on November 20, 2009 that the Maloof family would no longer operate the Monarchs. The league attempted to re-locate the Monarchs to the San Francisco Bay area, but on December 8, 2009 it was announced that new ownership could not be found and a dispersal draft would be held on December 14, 2009.  As of November 2019, the Monarchs were the last WNBA team to cease operations.

Possibility of rebirth
In October of 2009, there were plans to relocate the Monarchs to Oakland but they never came to fruition. The ownership group of the Sacramento Kings, led by Vivek Ranadivé, have indicated a desire to bring back the Monarchs as shared tenants for the new Golden 1 Center an intention shared with former Sacramento mayor Kevin Johnson, himself a former professional basketball player in the NBA.

Season-by-season records

Players and coaches

Final roster

Head coaches
Mary Murphy (1997)
Heidi VanDerveer (1997–1998)
Sonny Allen (1999–2001)
Maura McHugh (2001–2003)
John Whisenant (2003–2006, 2009)
Jenny Boucek (2007–2009)

General managers
Jerry Reynolds (1997-2003)
John Whisenant (2003–09)

Hall of Famers
Bridgette Gordon
Ruthie Bolton
Ticha Penicheiro
Yolanda Griffith

Retired numbers

1 The Monarchs' first General Manager, has a retired jersey marked "GM", that was hung onto the ARCO Arena's rafters in 2004.

Notable players
Chantelle Anderson
Cass Bauer-Bilodeau
Cindy Blodgett
Rebekkah Brunson
Erin Buescher
Latasha Byears
Edna Campbell
Bridgette Gordon
Lady Grooms
Yolanda Griffith
Kristin Haynie
Kedra Holland-Corn
Kara Lawson
Hamchetou Maiga-Ba
Pamela McGee
Courtney Paris
Ticha Penicheiro
Nicole Powell
Scholanda Robinson
Laure Savasta
Olympia Scott-Richardson
Tangela Smith
Kate Starbird
Katy Steding
Chantel Tremitiere
DeMya Walker
Kara Wolters
Adrian Williams-Strong

All-Stars
1999: Ticha Penicheiro, Ruthie Bolton-Holifield, Yolanda Griffith
2000: Ticha Penicheiro, Yolanda Griffith
2001: Ticha Penicheiro, Ruthie Bolton-Holifield, Yolanda Griffith
2002: Ticha Penicheiro
2003: Yolanda Griffith
2004: None but Yolanda Griffith on USA Olympic Team
2005: Yolanda Griffith, DeMya Walker
2006: Yolanda Griffith
2007: Yolanda Griffith, Kara Lawson, Rebekkah Brunson
2008: No All-Star Game
2009: Nicole Powell

References

External links
 Monarchs Fans discussion newsgroup
 Monarchs fansite

 
Defunct Women's National Basketball Association teams
Basketball teams established in 1997
Basketball teams disestablished in 2009
Defunct basketball teams in California
Basketball teams in Sacramento, California
1997 establishments in California
Basketball teams in California
2009 disestablishments in California